David Christopher Crossman  (born 20 July 1957) is a physician who has been the Dean of the University of St Andrews School of Medicine since 2014 and was the Chief Scientist (Health) within the Health and Social Care Directorates of the Scottish Government from 2017 to 2022.

Early life and education

Crossman was born in 1957 to William George and Charmian Jeanette Crossman. He has attributed his interest in cardiology to Christiaan Barnard doing the first heart transplant in 1967 while he was having his tonsils removed. Following this ambition of being a cardiologist, Crossman studied medicine at St Bartholomew's Hospital Medical College and in 1979 with a first class BSc in Physiology and in 1982 with an MBBS degree.

Career
From university Crossman trained in clinical pharmacology and worked at Hammersmith Hospital in London from 1985 under Celia Oakley and Attilio Maseri before becoming Professor of Clinical Cardiology at the University of Sheffield in 1994. While in this role, Crossman was director of a National Institute for Health Research research unit. In 2011, Crossman became the Dean of Medicine at the University of East Anglia. In 2014 Crossman then moved to be the Dean and Bute Chair of Medicine at the University of St Andrews School of Medicine. 

During his tenure at St. Andrews, Crossman has overseen the proposed return of degree awarding powers to the medical school as part of the Scottish Government's 'Programme for Government' and the establishment of a graduate-entry medicine degree at the University of St. Andrews.

In addition, Crossman was Chairman of the Efficacy and Mechanism Evaluation (EME) Board within the National Institute for Health Research from 2016 to 2019, succeeding Rajesh Thakker in the role.

Crossman was appointed an Honorary Fellow of the British Pharmacological Society in 2020.

Chief Scientist for Health
In November 2017 Crossman was appointed as the Chief Scientist (Health) within the Health and Social Care Directorates of the Scottish Government, succeeding Professor Andrew Morris who in turn had succeeded Professor Sir John Savill. The role primarily concerns itself with managing the Scottish Government's affairs within medical research in Scotland, something which Crossman has expressed enthusiasm for. In this role, Crossman was one of the fifteen members of the Office for Strategic Coordination of Health Research (OSCHR).

Crossman concluded his term as Chief Scientist (Health) in June 2022. On his departure, Cabinet Secretary for Health Humza Yousaf thanked Crossman for his service

Crossman was appointed Commander of the Order of the British Empire (CBE) in the 2023 New Year Honours for services to public health in Scotland.

Covid-19 Pandemic

During the Covid-19 pandemic Crossman has served as Vice-Chairman of the Scottish Government Covid-19 advisory group and as Chair of the Scottish Government COVID-19 Test Strategy Group.

References 

Fellows of the Royal College of Physicians
Fellows of the Royal Society of Edinburgh
20th-century British medical doctors
21st-century British medical doctors
Living people
1957 births
Academics of the University of East Anglia
Commanders of the Order of the British Empire